Francisco Javier Núñez Núñez (born 13 March 1982) is a Spanish politician of the People's Party, mayor of Almansa and Member in the Cortes of Castilla-La Mancha. Between 2011 and 2015 he was President of the Provincial Council of Albacete.

On 27 September 2018 he won the primaries of the People's Party of Castilla–La Mancha, becoming the next President of the party in the Extraordinary Congress to be held on 7 October in Albacete.

References

1982 births
Living people
People's Party (Spain) politicians
Members of the 9th Cortes of Castilla–La Mancha
Members of the Cortes of Castilla–La Mancha from Albacete
Mayors of places in Castilla–La Mancha
Members of the 10th Cortes of Castilla–La Mancha
People from Almansa